The Michael Nyman Orchestra is a group that expands on the Michael Nyman Band for specific album work, often for movie soundtracks.

History
In 1993, the Michael Nyman Band joined with an orchestra for the first time in their recording history with MGV: Musique à Grand Vitesse.  The album credit is to "The Michael Nyman Band and Orchestra".

The Michael Nyman Orchestra has operated as a formal group since then.  Such soundtrack albums as Practical Magic, Ravenous, The End of the Affair, The Claim, and The Libertine are credited to this Orchestra. While the former two titles lack detailed credits, the latter three albums show that most of the Orchestra has remained consistent.

Personnel 
From the 2000 soundtrack album The Claim.

Violin 

Alexander Balanescu (leader)
Cathy Thompson
Maciej Rokowski
Patrick Kiernan
Ann Morfee
Mark Berrow
Paul Willey
Rachel Allen
Tom Bowes

Ian Humphries
Boguslav Kosteci
Dermot Crehan
Philippa Ibbotson
Jonathan Evans-Jones
Julian Leaper
Ed Coxon
Peter Hanson
Helen Paterson

Viola 

Kate Musker
Steve Tees
Vicci Wardman

Bruce White
Andy Parker
Paul Martin

Cello 

Anthony Hinnigan
Sophie Harris

Nick Cooper
William Schofield

Double Bass 

Mike Brittain

Paul Sherman

Bass guitar 
Martin Elliott

Oboe/Cor Anglais 
Chris Hooker

Clarinet/Bass Clarinet 
Dave Fuest

Flute/Piccolo 
Jonathan Snowden

Soprano Sax/Alto Sax 

Dave Roach

Simon Haram

Baritone Sax 
Andy Findon

Trumpet/Flugel/Piccolo Trumpet 
Steve Sidwell

French Horn 

Dave Lee

Paul Gargham

Trombone/Tuba 
Nigel Barr

Percussion 
Greg Knowles

London orchestras
Michael Nyman